Edward Henry Ozmun (August 6, 1857 – December 9, 1910) was an American lawyer, diplomat, and politician.

Biography
Edward Henry Ozmun was born in Rochester, Minnesota on August 6, 1857. His father was Abram Ozmun, who served in the Minnesota State Legislature and as mayor of Rochester.

Ozmun married Clara B. Goodman on November 21, 1894, and they had one daughter.

He went to the University of Wisconsin. He then received his bachelor's and law degree from the University of Michigan. He practiced law in Saint Paul, Minnesota. He served in the Minnesota State Senate from 1895 to 1898 as a Republican. Ozmun then served in the United States Consular Service. He was first stationed in Stuttgart, Germany. In 1905, he became consul-general at Constantinople, Ottoman Empire, serving until his death there on December 9, 1910.

Notes

1857 births
1910 deaths
Politicians from Rochester, Minnesota
Politicians from Saint Paul, Minnesota
University of Michigan Law School alumni
University of Wisconsin–Madison alumni
American consuls
Minnesota lawyers
Republican Party Minnesota state senators
19th-century American politicians
19th-century American lawyers